An International Standard Archival Authority Record (ISAAR) is a form of authority control record, standardized by the Committee of Descriptive Standards of the International Council on Archives.

ISAAR (CPF) is the International Standard Archival Authority Record For Corporate Bodies, Persons and Families; its second edition was adopted by the committee in 2003.

References 

Library cataloging and classification
Metadata
Index (publishing)